Goward Dolmen is a megalithic dolmen or cromlech situated between Hilltown and Castlewellan in County Down, Northern Ireland, two miles from Hilltown. It is in a farmer's field in the townland of Goward, in the parish of Clonduff. It is known locally as Pat Kearney's Big Stone or Cloughmore Cromlech. The huge granite capstone has slipped from its original horizontal position.

Goward Dolmen portal tomb is a State Care Historic Monument in the townland of Goward, in the Newry and Mourne District Council area, at grid ref: J2437 3104.

Features

Folklore

References

External links
Shadow and Stone - Goward Dolmen Photographs

Archaeological sites in County Down
Dolmens in Northern Ireland